The Andean cock-of-the-rock (Rupicola peruvianus), also known as tunki (Quechua), is a large passerine bird of the cotinga family native to Andean cloud forests in South America. It is widely regarded as the national bird of Peru. It has four subspecies and its closest relative is the Guianan cock-of-the-rock.

The Andean cock-of-the-rock exhibits marked sexual dimorphism; the male has a large disk-like crest and scarlet or brilliant orange plumage, while the female is significantly darker and browner. Gatherings of males compete for breeding females with each male displaying his colourful plumage, bobbing and hopping, and making a variety of calls. After mating, the female makes a nest under a rocky overhang, incubates the eggs, and rears the young by herself.

The Andean cock-of-the-rock eats a diet of fruit, supplemented by insects, amphibians, reptiles, and smaller mice. Even though it is being affected by destruction of its habitat, the Andean cock-of-the-rock is not classified as threatened.

Taxonomy and etymology
One of two species in the genus Rupicola, the other being the Guianan cock-of-the-rock, the Andean cock-of-the-rock was first described by English ornithologist John Latham in 1790. It is classified in the Cotingidae, a family of largely frugivorous tropical forest suboscine passerines. The generic name is derived from the Latin stems rupes "rock" or "cliff", and cola "inhabiting", and is derived from its habit of nesting in rock walls. Its specific epithet peruvianus "of Peru" is masculine despite the -a ending of the genus name (in Latin, names in -cola were masculine or neuter); peruviana is seen in older works.

Four subspecies are known:
 R. p. peruvianus – (Latham, 1790), nominate subspecies
 R. p. aequatorialis – Taczanowski, 1889
 R. p. sanguinolentus – Gould, 1859
 R. p. saturatus – Cabanis and Heine, 1859

Description

The bird is one of many bird species to exhibit marked sexual dimorphism. The male has a large disk-like crest and brilliant scarlet or orange plumage. He has a black tail and wings, and pale greyish scapulars. The female is significantly drabber and browner than the male and has a less prominent crest. The bill is yellowish in the male, and dark with a small yellow tip in the female. Depending on gender and subspecies there are significant variations in the color of the iris, ranging from red over orange and yellow to bluish-white in the male, and whitish over reddish to brown in the female. In addition to the display calls described in the breeding section below, foraging birds give a loud querulous “tank?” when disturbed or in flight.

Distribution and habitat
The Andean cock-of-the-rock is distributed in cloud forests of the Andes. It typically stays in the lower and middle forest levels, but will range higher in fruiting trees and will sometimes enter and cross clearings. It is generally shy and inconspicuous, often seen only briefly after being flushed out or while swiftly flying down a valley.

R. p. aequatorialis is the most widespread subspecies, ranging across the Andes of East Colombia to West Venezuela, East Ecuador and East Peru.             The nominate subspecies, R. p. peruvianus has a small range stretching only through the Andes of Central Peru. R. p. sanguinolentus ranges throughout the Andes in West Colombia to Northwest Ecuador. The subspecies R. p. saturatus has a range across Southeast Peru and West Bolivia.

Behavior

Food and feeding
The diet consists mainly of fruit and insects, although small reptiles and frogs have been recorded. The fruits consumed are often from the plant families Lauraceae, Annonaceae, and Rubiaceae, although a few other plant families have also been reported in their diet. They are one of many species recorded following army ants. They occasionally will eat high protein fruits, but they prefer to eat the other fruits on their menu.

Breeding

Male cocks-of-the-rock are polygamous, and have nothing to do with nesting once mating is done. The male's energy instead is devoted to very elaborate display rituals that show off his magnificent plumage. These displays take place in communal leks, where males gather to challenge rivals and beckon the females. The males are easily disturbed, so their behavior is not easy to see. One study reported that the display activity is dependent on light intensity, with the morning display period occurring during the same light intensity level as the afternoon period.

At the lek, males have been observed to break up into pairs, performing “confrontation displays”. This consists of facing each other while bowing, jumping, and flapping their wings, sometimes even snapping their bills, and at the same time giving off various squawking and grunting calls. When the female approaches, she becomes even more intense. The display turns into a cacophony of bright color and a frenzied activity filling the air with very strange sounds.

Breeding takes place during different times of year in different areas. In Colombia, breeding normally happens in February until July. In Ecuador, the breeding interval spans from July until February.

Nesting
The nests, built entirely by the female, are mud plastered to cave entrances or rocky outcrops in forest ravines. The nests are often constructed from the saliva of the females mixed in with vegetable matter and mud. The nest is shaped like a concave cup. The female typically lays two white eggs. The female incubates these eggs for about 25 to 28 days.

Impact on environment
Andean cocks-of-the-rocks influence the environment around them. It was found that a white-capped dipper renovated an abandoned cock-of-the-rock nest to lay its eggs in. Cock-of-the-rocks also change the surrounding flora through seed dispersal. Seeds that the birds ingest often are found deposited around lek and nesting sites. This favors the germination and growth of those seeds. The diversity of these types of seeds has been found to be increased at lek and nests and decreased throughout the surrounding forest.

Predators
Andean cocks-of-the-rock face slightly larger predators than smaller songbirds. Predators are attracted to leks by the conspicuous behavior of the displaying males. The animals reported to prey on adult cocks-of-the-rock include hawk-eagles, forest-falcons, hawks, owls, jaguars, mountain lions, ocelots and the boa constrictor.

Relationship with humans
The Andean cock-of-the-rock is regarded as the national bird of Peru. Juveniles and adults have occasionally been used as pets.

Conservation
The worldwide population size and trends in population numbers have not been determined, but it is believed that the Andean cock-of-the-rock is not threatened. The species is evaluated as Least Concern on the IUCN Red List of Threatened Species despite habitat destruction. It is patchily distributed, but its range is large enough to sustain it at a Least Concern status.

References

External links 

 
 
 
 

Rupicola (bird)
Birds of the Northern Andes
Birds described in 1790
Taxa named by John Latham (ornithologist)
Peruvian culture
Birds of the Yungas